Rebecca Lewis (born , known as Becky), is an English long-distance swimmer.

In 2011 she swam for 35 hours 18 minutes as part of "The Swim", a relay team crossing the Irish Sea.

In 2015 she broke the record for the fastest time for a two-way swim the length of Windermere, in the regular competition held by the British Long Distance Swimming Association.

In 2016 she broke the record for the fastest British swimmer to make a two-way crossing of the English channel.

She appeared with Paul Rose in the "Windermere" episode of his 2018 BBC One series The Lakes with Paul Rose.

She is a physiotherapist and works in Barrow in Furness.

References

External links
  

Year of birth missing (living people)
Living people
English female swimmers
British long-distance swimmers
Female long-distance swimmers
Sportspeople from Barrow-in-Furness
British physiotherapists